Quivira is a serif Unicode typeface by Alexander Lange.

Quivira was designed to provide broad coverage of the Universal Character Set with generous licensing terms. The most recent update, version 4.1 in 2019, covers 11,053 glyphs. Originally published under the Open Font License, Lange abandoned the project in 2019, deeding it into the public domain, and moved on to a sans-serif companion font, Catrinity.

The following Unicode blocks are supported [excerpted from the font's site; see below under "External links"]:

 Basic Latin (00000 – 0007F) (95)
 Latin-1 Supplement (00080 – 000FF) (96)
 Latin Extended-A (00100 – 0017F) (128)
 Latin Extended-B (00180 – 0024F) (208)
 IPA Extensions (00250 – 002AF) (96)
 Spacing Modifier Letters (002B0 – 002FF) (80)
 Combining Diacritical Marks (00300 – 0036F) (111)
 Greek and Coptic (00370 – 003FF) (135)
 Cyrillic (00400 – 004FF) (256)
 Cyrillic Supplement (00500 – 00520) (48)
 Armenian (00530 – 0058F) (89)
 Hebrew (00590 – 005FF) (87)
 Samaritan (00800 – 0083F) (61)
 Thai (00E00 – 00E7F) (87)
 Georgian (010A0 – 010FF) (83)
 Cherokee (013A0 – 013FF) (85)
 Unified Canadian Aboriginal Syllabics (01400 – 0167F) (640)
 Ogham (01680 – 0169F) (29)
 Runic (016A0 – 016FF) (87)
 Tagalog (01700 – 0171F) (20)
 Hanunoo (01720 – 0173F) (23)
 Buhid (01740 – 0175F) (20)
 Tagbanwa (01760 – 0177F) (18)
 Unified Canadian Aboriginal Syllabics Extended (018B0 – 018FF) (70)
 Phonetic Extensions (01D00 – 01D7F) (128)
 Phonetic Extensions Supplement (01D80 – 01DBF) (64)
 Latin Extended Additional (01E00 – 01EFF) (256)
 Greek Extended (01F00 – 01FFF) (233)
 General Punctuation (02000 – 0206F) (85)
 Superscripts and Subscripts (02070 – 0209F) (42)
 Currency Symbols (020A0 – 020CF) (30)
 Letterlike Symbols (02100 – 0214F) (80)
 Number Forms (02150 – 0218F) (58)
 Arrows (02190 – 021FF) (112)
 Mathematical Operators (02200 – 022FF) (256)
 Miscellaneous Technical (02300 – 023FF) (251)
 Control Pictures (02400 – 0243F) (39)
 Optical Character Recognition (02440 – 0245F) (11)
 Enclosed Alphanumerics (02460 – 024FF) (160)
 Box Drawing (02500 – 0257F) (128)
 Block Elements (02580 – 0259F) (32)
 Geometric Shapes (025A0 – 025FF) (96)
 Miscellaneous Symbols (02600 – 026FF) 220 characters (out of 256)
 Dingbats (02700 – 027BF) 160 characters (out of 192)
 Miscellaneous Mathematical Symbols-A (027C0 – 027EF) (46)
 Supplemental Arrows-A (027F0 – 027FF) (16)
 Braille Patterns (02800 – 028FF) (256)
 Supplemental Arrows-B (02900 – 0297F) (128)
 Miscellaneous Mathematical Symbols-B (02980 – 029FF) (128)
 Supplemental Mathematical Operators (02A00 – 02AFF) (256)
 Miscellaneous Symbols and Arrows (02B00 – 02BFF) (202)
 Glagolitic (02C00 – 02C5F) (94)
 Latin Extended-C (02C60 – 02C7F) (32)
 Coptic (02C80 – 02CFF) (121)
 Georgian Supplement (02D00 – 02D2F) (38)
 Tifinagh (02D30 – 02D7F) (56)
 Cyrillic Extended-A (02DE0 – 02DFF) (32)
 Supplemental Punctuation (02E00 – 02E7F) (67)
 Ideographic Description Characters (02FF0 – 02FFF) (12)
 CJK Symbols and Punctuation (03000 – 0303F) 8 characters (out of 64)
 Enclosed CJK Letters and Months (03200 – 032FF) 39 characters (out of 254)
 Yijing Hexagram Symbols (04DC0 – 04DFF) (64)
 Lisu (0A4D0 – 0A4FF) (48)
 Vai (0A500 – 0A63F) (300)
 Cyrillic Extended-B (0A640 – 0A69F) (95)
 Modifier Tone Letters (0A700 – 0A71F) (32)
 Latin Extended-D (0A720 – 0A7FF) (152)
 Alphabetic Presentation Forms (0FB00 – 0FB4F) (58)
 Halfwidth and Fullwidth Forms (0FF00 – 0FFEF) 110 characters (out of 225)
 These are fixed width variants of the Basic Latin characters, meant for use with East-Asian ideographs.
 Specials (0FFF0 – 0FFFF) (5)
 Aegean Numbers (10100 – 1013F) (57)
 Ancient Greek Numbers (10140 – 1018F) (77)
 Ancient Symbols (10190 – 101CF) (13)
 Lycian (10280 – 1029F) (29)
 Carian (102A0 – 102DF) (49)
 Old Italic (10300 – 1032F) (36)
 Gothic (10330 – 1034F) (27)
 Ugaritic (10380 – 1039F) (31)
 Imperial Aramaic (10840 – 1085F) (31)
 Phoenician (10900 – 1091F) (29)
 Lydian (10920 – 1093F) (27)
 Old South Arabian (10A60 – 10A7F) (32)
 Old Turkic (10C00 – 10C4F) (73)
 Musical Symbols (1D100 – 1D1FF) 83 characters (out of 220)
 Ancient Greek Musical Notation (1D200 – 1D24F) (70)
 Tai Xuan Jing Symbols (1D300 – 1D35F) (87)
 Counting Rod Numerals (1D360 – 1D37F) (18)
 Mathematical Alphanumeric Symbols (1D400 – 1D7FF) (996)
 Mahjong Tiles (1F000 – 1F02F) (44)
 Domino Tiles (1F030 – 1F09F) (100)
 Playing Cards (1F0A0 – 1F0FF) (82)
 Enclosed Alphanumerics Supplement (1F100 – 1F1FF) (173)
 Miscellaneous Symbols and Pictographs (1F300 – 1F5FF) 191 characters (out of 742)
 Emoticons (1F600 – 16F4F) (78)
 Alchemical Symbols (1F700 – 1F77F) (116)
 Geometric Shapes Extended (1F780 – 1F7FF) 64 characters (out of 85)

External links
Quivira
Quivera, a fairly complete Unicode font

Serif typefaces
Cyrillic typefaces
Greek typefaces
Hebrew typefaces
Latin-script typefaces
Unicode typefaces
Emoji typefaces
Digital typefaces
Free software Unicode typefaces
IPA typefaces